The Groundsman is a 2013 short film produced by the Royal Conservatoire of Scotland. Written & Directed by Jonny Blair, Starring David O'Hara. The film depicts a lonely football groundsman named Keith (O'Hara) who finds out his club has gone out of business, but instead of moving on with his life and acknowledging his past affairs, he tries his utmost to keep the club running.

The film screened for the first time at Cineworld in Glasgow on 20 June 2013 with the four other graduation films.

In 2014, the film was nominated for 3 Bafta Scotland New Talent awards for Best Editing, Best Fiction and Best Writing. It went on to win Best Fiction and Best Editing.

Cast
David O'Hara as Keith
Brian McCardie as Steve

Production
Filming started on Sunday 5 May for a half day until Friday 10 May 2013. Also was a half day in April where a football match was shot. David O'Hara was cast as Keith, whom Jonny Blair knew personally, with Brian McCardie, Jim Sweeney, Darran Lightbody and Frank Lovering (Benburb manager) rounding out the cast. Locations were a house in King's Park, Tinto Park in Govan, home of Benburb FC which the film was built around, Bell's Bar on Govan Road and a country road near Bishopton.

Accolades
Flutlicht Fussball Film Festival Official Selection 2016
2ANNAS Riga International Film Festival Official Selection 2015
Williamsburg Independent Film Festival Official Selection 2014
Aguilar de Campoo Short Film Festival 2014 / In Competition
Inverness Film Festival Official Selection 2014
CineFringe Film Festival Official Selection 2014
Southside Film Festival Official Selection 2014
11mm Fussballfilmfestival Official Selection 2014
Hollywood Reel Independent Film Festival Official Selection 2014 / In competition for Best Student Short
Glasgow Short Film Festival Official Selection 2014 / In competition for Scottish Competition
London Short Film Festival Official Selection 2014
Royal Television Society Scotland 2014, Nomination for Best Student Fiction
BAFTA Scotland New Talent Awards 2014, Won Best Fiction and Best Editing

External links

References

2013 films
2010s English-language films